In organic chemistry, GM2 is a type of ganglioside. G refers to ganglioside, the M is for monosialic (as in it has one sialic acid), and 2 refers to the fact that it was the second monosialic ganglioside discovered. It is associated with GM2 gangliosidoses such as Tay–Sachs disease.

See also
 Ganglioside GM2 activator protein

Additional images

References

External links
 

Glycolipids